Guldhjälmen (The Gold Helmet) is a Swedish ice hockey award, which is awarded annually to the's most valuable player of the Swedish Hockey League (SHL) and of the Swedish Women's Hockey League (SDHL) as decided by a vote of each league’s players.

First awarded in the SHL in 1986, the Guldhjälmen is sponsored by the Swedish hockey magazine Hockey in cooperation with CCM Hockey. It is considered one of the most prestigious ice hockey prizes in Sweden. It is similar to the country's Viking Award, presented to the top Swede playing in North America as determined by player vote, and the NHL's Ted Lindsay Award, an MVP award also voted on by the players. It should not be confused with Guldpucken (Golden Puck), which is awarded by Expressen and the Swedish Ice Hockey Association to the Swedish Player of the Year.

The first woman to be awarded the Guldhjälmen by vote of the SDHL players was Lara Stalder of Brynäs IF in 2020. It should not be confused with the Kronprinsessan Margaretas pris (Crown Princess Margaretas Award), also called the SDHL MVP, which is awarded to the SDHL MVP as chosen by the Swedish Ice Hockey Association.

Winners (Women) 
 2020 - Lara Stalder, Brynäs IF
 2021 - Kateřina Mrázová, Brynäs IF
 2022 - Sidney Brodt, Linköping HC

Winners (Men) 
Players in bold type also won that season's Guldpucken.
 1986 - Kari Eloranta, HV71
 1987 - Peter Lindmark, Färjestad BK
 1988 - Anders Eldebrink, Södertälje SK
 1989 - Anders Eldebrink, Södertälje SK (2)
 1990 - Bengt-Åke Gustafsson, Färjestad BK
 1991 - Håkan Loob, Färjestad BK
 1992 - Håkan Loob, Färjestad BK (2)
 1993 - Peter Forsberg, Modo Hockey
 1994 - Peter Forsberg, Modo Hockey (2)
 1995 - Pelle Eklund, Leksands IF
 1996 - Esa Keskinen, HV71
 1997 - Jarmo Myllys, Luleå HF
 1998 - Tommy Söderström, Djurgårdens IF
 1999 - Jan Larsson, Brynäs IF
 2000 - Rikard Franzén, AIK
 2001 - Kristian Huselius, Västra Frölunda HC
 2002 - Ulf Söderström, Färjestad BK
 2003 - Niklas Andersson, Västra Frölunda HC
 2004 - Magnus Kahnberg, Västra Frölunda HC
 2005 - Henrik Lundqvist, Frölunda HC
 2006 - Andreas Karlsson, HV71
 2007 - Fredrik Bremberg, Djurgårdens IF
 2008 - Tony Mårtensson, Linköpings HC
 2009 - Johan Davidsson, HV71
 2010 - Mats Zuccarello, Modo Hockey
 2011 - Magnus Johansson, Linköpings HC
 2012 - Jakob Silfverberg, Brynäs IF
 2013 - Bud Holloway, Skellefteå AIK
 2014 - Joakim Lindström, Skellefteå AIK
 2015 - Derek Ryan, Örebro HK
 2016 - Anton Rödin, Brynäs IF
 2017 - Joakim Lindström, Skellefteå AIK (2)
 2018 - Joakim Lindström, Skellefteå AIK (3)
 2019 - Jacob Josefson, Djurgårdens IF
 2020 - Kodie Curran, Rögle BK
 2021 - Marek Hrivík, Leksands IF
 2022 - Max Véronneau, Leksands IF
 2023 - Antti Suomela, IK Oskarshamn

References

 

Awards established in 1986
Swedish ice hockey trophies and awards
Swedish Hockey League
Swedish Women's Hockey League
1986 establishments in Sweden